Beardy's 97 and Okemasis 96 is an Indian reserve of the Beardy's and Okemasis' Cree Nation in Saskatchewan. It is 58 kilometres southwest of Prince Albert. In the 2016 Canadian Census, it recorded a population of 1323 living in 301 of its 311 total private dwellings. In the same year, its Community Well-Being index was calculated at 52 of 100, compared to 58.4 for the average First Nations community and 77.5 for the average non-Indigenous community.

References

Indian reserves in Saskatchewan
Division No. 15, Saskatchewan